DAV College is a co-educational college in  Chandigarh, India. It was founded in 1958. Affiliated to the Panjab University, Chandigarh. The college offers various courses at undergraduate and postgraduate level. It is situated in Sector 10, Chandigarh, India.

Affiliation 
DAV College, is affiliated with Punjab University, Chandigarh. It is managed by the Dayanand Anglo-Vedic College Trust and Management Society.

History 
The college was founded in 1959, when the city of Chandigarh was in its infancy. The college belongs to the family of DAV institutions, founded by Mahatma Hans Raj, and inspired by the visionary Swami Dayanand Saraswati, the doyen of the Arya Samaj. The DAV movement, which started in 1886, aims to develop a scientific approach among the students, coupled with an understanding of their roots in the ancient Vedic Culture.

Accreditation 
DAV College awarded 'A' Grade by NAAC. It is ranked - Commerce-45, Bca-21, Arts-35 and Science-33, as per a survey by India Today, June,2020."

The National Institute of Educational Planning and Administration (NIEPA) has declared the college a "Model College". It has launched postgraduate programmes in I.T., Commerce, English, Bioinformatics, Biotechnology, Chemistry, Maths, Zoology, Psychology, Public Administration, Sociology, Business Economics; and postgraduate diplomas.

Social commitment 
Students involve themselves in programmes like blood donation, drug de-addiction, polio campaign and service to the blind, giving shelter to street children, and literacy classes for senior citizens. The training is given free of cost.

Martyrs 
The college has a tradition of remembering its students who laid down their lives for the service of the nation. There are four pillars at the entrance of the Administrative Block which depicts the name and laurels of the Martyrs. The list of the name of the martyrs are Capt. Vikram Batra, PVC, 2/Lt. Rajiv Sandhu, MVC, Capt. Vijyant Thapar, Vr. C., Maj. Sandeep Sagar, Capt. Atul Sharma, Maj. Navneet Vats, SM, Brig. B.S. Shergill, Capt. Rohit Kaushal, SM, Capt. Ripudaman Singh Rajawat, Lt. Anil Yadav, SM, Flt. Lt. Gursmirat Singh Dhindsa, Maj. Manwindra Singh.

Before the start of every function, the college has a custom of offering floral tribute to the martyrs, by way of paying homage to them.

Notable alumni
Vikram Batra
Rajiv Pratap Rudy
Kaiku Rajkumar
Ayushmann Khurrana
Rochak Kohli
Amit Rawal
Narender Singh Ahlawat
Lawrence Bishnoi
The school has produced 58 international sportsmen including Kapil Dev, Yuvraj Singh,  Yograj Singh, Dinesh Mongia, Neeraj Chopra, Anjum Moudgil and Jeev Milkha Singh.

See also 

 Arya Samaj

References

External links 
 

Educational institutions established in 1958
Universities and colleges in Chandigarh
Universities and colleges affiliated with the Arya Samaj
1958 establishments in East Punjab